Yershova is a rural locality (a village) in Leninskoye Rural Settlement, Kudymkarsky District, Perm Krai, Russia. The population was 7 as of 2010.

Geography 
Yershova is located 40 km south of Kudymkar (the district's administrative centre) by road. Gavrilova is the nearest rural locality.

References 

Rural localities in Kudymkarsky District